Tomas Maronesi (born 7 April 1985), commonly known as Tomas, is a Brazilian-born Hong Kong professional footballer who currently plays for Hong Kong Premier League club Southern, on loan from Kitchee.

Club career
After failing to achieve success in Brazil, Tomas signed with Rangers of the Hong Kong First Division in 2013. He made his debut for the club in a 2–2 draw with Yuen Long.

On 2 August 2019, Rangers' Director Philip Lee announced that Tomas had signed a contract to return to the club.

On 20 May 2020, it was revealed that Tomas had signed with Kitchee.

On 31 January 2023, Tomas was loaned to Southern for the remaining of the season.

International career
On 19 October 2021, Tomas officially announced that he had received a Hong Kong passport, making him eligible to represent Hong Kong internationally.

On 8 June 2022, Tomas made his international debut for Hong Kong in the Asian Cup qualifiers against Afghanistan.

Honours
Yuen Long
Hong Kong Senior Shield: 2017–18
Kitchee
 Hong Kong Premier League: 2019–20

References

External links

Tomas Maronesi at HKFA

1985 births
Living people
People from Santa Rosa, Rio Grande do Sul
Brazilian emigrants to Hong Kong
Naturalized footballers of Hong Kong
Association football defenders
Hong Kong footballers
Hong Kong international footballers
Brazilian footballers
Hong Kong Rangers FC players
Southern District FC players
Yuen Long FC players
Kitchee SC players
Hong Kong First Division League players
Hong Kong Premier League players